Weller House may refer to:

Weller House (Fort Bragg, California), listed on the National Register of Historic Places (NRHP)
Weller House (Chesterton, Indiana), listed on the National Register of Historic Places in Porter County, Indiana
Bonavita-Weller House, Anchorage, Kentucky, listed on the NRHP in Anchorage, Kentucky
House of Weller, Louisville, Kentucky, listed on the NRHP in Downtown Louisville, Kentucky